St Andrew's Church is a church in Stoke Dry, Rutland. It is a Grade I listed building.

History
The parvis was built to be a chamber for the priest. The Gunpowder Plot is said ("an implausible rumour") to have been planned here but the manor house at Ashby St Ledgers, Northamptonshire also claims to be the site. 
Stoke Dry's manor was held by the Digby family in the early 17th century. Sir Everard Digby was one of the Gunpowder plotters and was executed for his role.

The chapel and north wall of the chancel have Norman stonework. The chancel arch contains Norman carvings on the shafts either side of the arch; on the south shaft is a man pulling on a bell-rope.

A 15th-century carved screen is positioned either side of the chancel and nave. It doesn't fit well so might have been moved here from a different church.

Lying on the 1694 bier, beside the Norman font, is a Bible and prayer book dating from 1856. There are fragments of stone memorials one thought to be that of Francis Clarke of Stoke Dry (d. 1435).

The chancel has a table tomb to Kenelm Digby (died 1590)  and his family. Beside the tomb is a memorial inscribed to a Dorothy Stevens. There is also a table tomb to a different Everard Digby (died 1540). There is also a monument to Jaquetta, the wife of Everard Digby who died at the 1461 Battle of Towton.

The south wall of the Digby Chapel has 13th-century wall paintings depicting the death of Edmund the Martyr and Jesus being carried by Saint Christopher.

The organ dates from 1810 and was made by Lincoln of London.

St Andrew's suffered from heritage crime in 2018 and is now on the Heritage at Risk Register. Repair works began in Autumn 2021.

Gallery

References

Stoke Dry
Stoke Dry